Corticifraga is a genus of lichenicolous fungi in the family Gomphillaceae.  The genus was circumscribed by David Leslie Hawksworth and Rolf Santesson in 1990, with Corticifraga peltigerae assigned as the type species.

Species
Corticifraga chugachiana  – Holarctic
Corticifraga fuckelii 
Corticifraga fusispora 
Corticifraga microspora 
Corticifraga nephromatis  – Alaska
Corticifraga peltigerae 
Corticifraga pseudocyphellariae 
Corticifraga santessonii  – Holarctic
Corticifraga scrobiculatae  – Alaska

References

Ostropales
Lichenicolous fungi
Ostropales genera
Taxa described in 1990
Taxa named by Rolf Santesson
Taxa named by David Leslie Hawksworth